The 2023 World Baseball Classic knockout stage is a single-elimination tournament of the 2023 World Baseball Classic taking place from March 15–21. The top two teams from each pool automatically qualify for the top eight knockout stage, beginning with the quarterfinals at the Tokyo Dome in Tokyo, Japan, and LoanDepot Park in Miami, Florida. The semifinals and final will be held in Miami.

Format

The top two teams from each pool advanced to the single elimination bracket. These games will be contested from March 15–21. Tokyo hosted two of the quarterfinals at the Tokyo Dome, while the other two quarterfinals, the semifinals, and the championship game will take place at LoanDepot Park in Miami, Florida.

During the quarterfinal round, the four first-round pool winners will be the designated home teams against the four runners-up. For the semifinals and championship game, the team with the better overall record will be the designated home team; if two opposing teams have the same record, home team designation will be determined by coin flip.

Qualified teams

Bracket

Quarterfinals

|}

Australia vs Cuba

The knockout stage opener in Tokyo marked Australia's first ever quarterfinal game. Previously, the team had never advanced past pool play. The Australians scored first in the top of the second inning when Rixon Wingrove singled in Darryl George. Cuba tied the game in the third on a Luis Robert Jr. groundout. Cuba broke the tie in the bottom of the fifth, scoring three runs: one off an Alfredo Despaigne sac fly, and two off a Yoelkis Guibert single. Australia cut the lead to one when Wingrove hit a two-run home run, which proved to be the final runs of the game. Raidel Martínez earned the save for Cuba, sending the team to the semifinals for the first time since 2006.

Italy vs Japan

Shohei Ohtani started for Japan, while Ryan Castellani started for Italy. In the bottom of the third, Kensuke Kondo and Ohtani hit back-to-back singles. The next batter, Masataka Yoshida, grounded out to score Kondo. After a Munetaka Murakami walk, Kazuma Okamoto homered to give Japan a 4–0 lead. Ohtani was removed from the game in the top of the fifth after giving up a two-run single to Dominic Fletcher. Ohtani was replaced by Hiromi Itoh, who completed the inning. Japan retaliated in the bottom of the inning when Murakami hit a two-run double. Okamoto followed up with another double, scoring Murakami. In the seventh, Yoshida homered off Joey Marciano to extend Japan's lead to 8–2. Sōsuke Genda added on another run with a single. Fletcher hit a solo homer in the eighth off Yu Darvish. Mitchell Stumpo struck out the side in the eighth for Italy, and Taisei Ota earned the save for Japan. Ohtani earned the pitching win, having thrown four scoreless innings. With the win, Japan continued their streak of being the only team to reach the semifinals in every WBC to date.

According to the Nikkan Sports, 48% of all households in Japan watched the game, making it the most watched Samurai Japan game in history. This beat the previous record of 44.4% set by the pool game against Korea just six days earlier.

Puerto Rico vs Mexico

This has been the second time Puerto Rico has faced off against Mexico in the WBC, with their first match being in pool play  in 2017. Puerto Rico won the game 9–4.

Marcus Stroman started for Puerto Rico, while Julio Urías started for Mexico. Urías got off to a shaky start, as Puerto Rico scored all of their four runs in the first inning. After an Kike Hernández walk and a Nelson Velásquez single, Emmanuel Rivera hit a sac fly to score Hernández for the first run of the game. Javier Báez and Eddie Rosario hit back-to-back homers to put Puerto Rico up 4–0. In the bottom of the second, Isaac Paredes homered for Mexico's first run of the game. Mexico began a rally in the fifth when Alek Thomas and Austin Barnes hit back-to-back singles off Stroman. Stroman then walked Randy Arozarena to load the bases. Alex Verdugo singled in Thomas for a run, which chased Stroman from the game. His replacement, Yacksel Ríos, was able to complete the inning without letting in any additional runs.

In the seventh, Puerto Rico's Alexis Díaz, brother of closer Edwin Díaz (who was injured while celebrating the team's win against the Dominican Republic two days earlier) entered the game to his brother's walkout song "Narco". Díaz promptly gave up a leadoff double to Barnes. He then walked Arozarena and Verdugo to load the bases, and was removed from the game and replaced with Jorge López. López got the next two batters out, bringing up Paredes. Paredes singled to left field, scoring Barnes and Arozarena and tying the game at four. Luis Urías then singled to bring home Verdugo, giving Mexico the lead for the first time. in the eighth, Puerto Rico nearly tied the game when Rivera hit a long ball to center field with a runner on first. However, Arozarena made a leaping catch against the wall to get Rivera out and rob Puerto Rico of the run. The bottom of the eighth was also scoreless. Puerto Rico put two runners on base in the ninth, but Mexico closer Giovanny Gallegos was able to get out of the jam by striking out Hernández. The comeback win sent Mexico to the semifinals for the first time in WBC history.

United States vs Venezuela

The United States and Venezuela previously met in the second round of the 2017 WBC. Team USA won the game, 4–2. 

Team USA jumped on top early when Mookie Betts scored on a Mike Trout single that was misthrown by Ronald Acuña Jr. Cardinals teammates Paul Goldschmidt and Nolan Arenado also singled, with Goldschmidt's hit scoring Trout. Kyle Tucker then hit a single to center field, scoring Goldschmidt. Tucker was initially called safe at second after a close tag play with José Altuve, but the call was overturned for the first out of the inning. Martín Pérez was replaced with José Ruiz, who retired Tim Anderson and Kyle Schwarber to end the inning. Venezuela immediately struck back in the bottom of the inning with a two-run shot from Luis Arráez. In the fourth, Schwarber scored on a Mookie Betts sac fly to extend Team USA's lead by one. Tucker hit a solo homer in the top of the fifth to make it 5–2 for the United States. Venezuela loaded the bases in the bottom of the inning by way of two walks and an Andrés Giménez single. United States pitcher Daniel Bard threw a wild pitch to allow Gleyber Torres to score. Bard was then removed after walking Anthony Santander. His replacement, Jason Adam, got Arraez to force out, but another run scored. The next batter, Salvador Pérez, doubled to right field, scoring pinch runner Luis Rengifo and tying the game at five. Acuña then hit a sac fly, scoring another run and giving Venezuela the lead. Adam retired David Peralta to end the inning.

In the seventh, Team USA put two runners on base but failed to score. In the bottom of the inning, Arraez hit a solo home run off the foul pole – his second homer of the night.  Team USA started off the eighth inning down by two runs as José Quijada walked Anderson with no outs. Pete Alonso then singled, and J. T. Realmuto was hit by a pitch to load the bases. Quijada was removed from the game and was replaced with Silvino Bracho. The first batter Bracho faced was Trea Turner. On an 0–2 count, Turner hit a grand slam to left field, giving the United States a two-run lead. In the bottom of the eighth, Devin Williams was able to work around a leadoff Acuña double by retiring the next three batters. Closer Ryan Pressly retired all three batters he faced in the bottom of the ninth to propel Team USA to the semifinals.

Semifinals

|}

Cuba vs United States

This marked the Cuban national team's first appearance in Miami since early in Fidel Castro's reign, dating back an estimated 60 years. The appearance of the team in Miami, which has the highest concentration of Cuban-Americans in the United States, caused a small protest to occur outside the stadium. Protestors viewed the team as in favor of the Cuban government's authoritarian policies. Anti-government sentiment also occurred inside the stadium, as Yoán Moncada and Luis Robert Jr., the first active MLB players to ever play for the Cuban national team, were booed. While Moncada batted in the fifth inning, a fan with a sign demanding justice for demonstrators imprisoned during the 2021 Cuban protests ran onto the field. Chants of "Libertad" and "Patria y Vida" were also heard.

Roenis Elías started for Cuba and Adam Wainwright started for the United States. In the first inning, Cuban players hit three straight infield singles to load the bases. Wainwright then walked Alfredo Despaigne to give Cuba a 1–0 lead with no outs. However, Wainwright was able to retire the next three batters to limit the damage. In the bottom of the inning, Paul Goldschmidt hit a two-run homer after a Mookie Betts double to give the US the lead. Trea Turner followed up on his heroic performance in the quarterfinal game by hitting a solo home run in the second inning. Team USA scored two more in the bottom of the fourth on a Pete Alonso single and a Tim Anderson sacrifice fly. In the fourth, Nolan Arenado tripled in his Cardinals teammate Goldschmidt to give the US a 6–1 lead. Arenado then scored on a wild pitch from Cuba's Carlos Viera. Cuba scored their second run of the game on an Andy Ibáñez single in the top of the fifth. Goldschmidt singled in two more runs off Elian Leyva in the bottom of the inning. Turner hit his second home run of the game in the sixth – a three-run shot off Leyva to give the US a commanding ten-run lead. Trout doubled in Betts in the same inning. In the eighth, Cedric Mullins hit a solo homer to complete the 14–2 blowout victory for the United States. The win sent Team USA to the finals for the second time in a row.

Mexico vs Japan

Patrick Sandoval will start in the semifinals for Mexico, while Rōki Sasaki will start for Japan.

Final

References

2023 World Baseball Classic
World Baseball Classic knockout
2020s in Miami
Baseball competitions in Miami
International baseball competitions hosted by the United States
International sports competitions in Florida
World Baseball Classic knockout
World Baseball Classic knockout
International baseball competitions hosted by Japan
World Baseball Classic knockout
Sports competitions in Tokyo